|}
Jonathan Martin Isaacs (born 10 September 1949) is an Australian former politician. He was the Labor member for Millner in the Northern Territory Legislative Assembly from 1977 to 1981, and was the ALP's first leader in that body and the Territory's first Opposition Leader.

The Electorate of Millner was named after James Millner, the medical officer in George Goyder's 1869 expedition to found the first colony at Port Darwin, who drowned in the SS Gothenburg tragedy.

References

1949 births
Living people
Members of the Northern Territory Legislative Assembly
Australian Labor Party members of the Northern Territory Legislative Assembly
Leaders of the Opposition in the Northern Territory